Kabudan (also Romanized as Kabūdān;  Kabudan rural district is mountainous village in, Zohan District, Zirkuh County, South Khorasan Province, Iran. At the 2006 census, its population was 922, in 232 families.

References 

Populated places in Zirkuh County